Zestafoni or Zestaponi is the administrative center of Zestafoni District in Western Georgia. Zestafoni is the center of an ancient, historical part of Georgia – Margveti, which is a  part of Imereti province. Zestafoni is the center  of Margveti's Eparchy of the Georgian Orthodox Church.  Zestafoni is situated in the furthest east of the Colchis Plateau, and is built on both banks of the Qvirila River.

It is an important industrial center, with a large ferro-alloy plant processing manganese ore from nearby Chiatura.
Zestafoni is in the Kolkheti lowlands, a semi-tropical region with relatively cold winters averaging  in January and hot summers averaging  in August. The surrounding countryside is a wine-growing region.

Industry

The town of Zestafoni and the smaller neighboring town of Shorapani are industrial centers.
The Zestafoni ferro-alloy plant processes raw manganese ore shipped by rail down the Kvirila valley from Chiatura, supplying 6% of world demand.
The largest ferroalloy plant in the country, in 1998 it produced 35,000 tonnes of silicomanganese and 11,000 tonnes of medium-carbon manganese alloy. This was well below its previous peak production of 110,000 tonnes of manganese-based alloys.
The British steel trading company Stemcor acquired the ferro-alloy plant in February 2006.

Two other plants in the Zestafoni / Shorapani area produce electrical products, aluminum and copper cable and wire. There were more plants in the Soviet era producing fireproof clay, marble and clothing. Zestafoni is also one of the winery-vinery centers of Georgia. Wine prepared from the Tsitsqa and Tsolikouri species are widely known.

History

The town of Zestafoni is first mentioned in historical records in the 1560s. The name of the city is connected with the bank of river Kvirila , upper bank , that was used by the local population and foreign travelers from ancient times.

In the 1820s a Cossack army was posted in the town, which was then called "Kvirila" after the river that runs through it. During the Russian Empire, the city was the administrative center of the Shorapani Uyezd of the Kutaisi Governorate. In the 1920s the name was changed again to "Jugeli", after a famous revolutionary. Only later did the city regain its historical name.

There are many historical monuments in the Zestafoni region: Zeda Saqara (11th century), Tabakini (6th century), Tseva (11th century), Sanakhshire and other churches, and castles from the early Middle Ages in Shrosha and Shorapani. Shorapani (Sarapanis) is the toponymy, that is mentioned in old Greek mythology. That was Sarapanis that Jason and his Argonaut friends approached during their travel in old Colchis (Kolkhida).

Sports and culture

The local football club, FC Zestafoni, plays in the top league in Georgia and twice won the Georgian championship in the 2010-11 and 2011-12 season. The local women's basketball team was champion of Georgia in 2011. The city's stadium was built by Zestafoni Ferro-alloy Plant in 1952 and since its renovation has a capacity of 4,600.

The writer Boris Akunin  and philosopher Tengiz Tsereteli were born in Zestafoni. The psychologist and philosopher Dimitri Uznadze was born in the nearby village of Sakara in 1886. Famous Georgian actors Shalva Ghambashidze, Ushangi Chkheidze, Sergo and Bukhuti Zakariadze were also born in Zestafoni. World wrestling (Greco-Roman) champion Mikhail Saladze is from Zestafoni.

Notable people
 Dimitri Uznadze - psychologist
 Boris Akunin
 Shalva Dadiani
 Zaza Tavadze - is a former chairman of the Constitutional Court of Georgia

Twin towns — sister cities
Zestafoni is twinned with:

See also
 Imereti

References

External links

Zestafoni.Ge

Cities and towns in Imereti
Kutaisi Governorate
Populated places in Zestafoni Municipality